The men's lightweight double sculls at the 2016 Summer Olympics in Rio de Janeiro were held from 8 to 12 August at the Lagoon Rodrigo de Freitas.

The medals for the competition were presented by Luis Alberto Moreno, Colombia, member of the International Olympic Committee, and the gifts were presented by Patrick Rombaut, Belgium, Member of the Executive Committee of the International Rowing Federation.

Schedule

Results

Heats
First two of each heat qualify to the semifinals, remainder goes to the repechage.

Heat 1

Heat 2

Heat 3

Heat 4

Repechage
First two qualify to the semifinals.

Repechage 1

Repechage 2

Semifinals

Semifinals C/D
First three qualify to Final C, remainder to Final D.

Semifinal 1

Semifinal 2

Semifinals A/B
First three qualify to Final A, remainder to Final B.

Semifinal 1

Semifinal 2

Finals

Final D

Final C

Final B

Final A

References

Men's lightweight double sculls
Men's events at the 2016 Summer Olympics